Vesicular inhibitory amino acid transporter is a protein that in humans is encoded by the SLC32A1 gene.

The protein encoded by this gene is an integral membrane protein involved in gamma-aminobutyric acid (GABA) and glycine uptake into synaptic vesicles. The encoded protein is a member of amino acid/polyamine transporter family II.

See also
 Solute carrier family

References

Further reading

Solute carrier family
Neurotransmitter transporters